Leckrone is a surname. Notable people with the surname include:

Michael Leckrone (born 1936), American marching band director
Phillip Leckrone (1912–1941), American pilot 
Walter Leckrone (1897–1964), American newspaper editor